Heat 4 Yo Azz is the debut album by Vallejo, California rapper, Celly Cel.  The album was released in 1994 for Sick Wid It Records and was produced by Celly Cel,  Sam Bostic and Studio Ton.  The album was mildly successful, making it to #34 on the Top R&B/Hip-Hop album chart. Guests include B-Legit, E-40 and Funk Mobb. The album was re-released on Jive Records the same year without the track "Zig Zags & Body Bags."

Track listing 
"Heat 4 Yo Azz"- 4:22 
"Bailin' Thru My Hood" feat. B-Legit- 4:29 
"What Am I Supposed to Do"- 4:29 
"How to Catch a Bitch" feat. E-40, Mugzi & T-Pup- 4:21 
"Funk 4 Life" feat. Levitti- 4:34 
"Gin Wit No Juice"- 5:20 
"Retalliation" feat. E-40- 5:09 
"Tha Body Shop"- 3:18 
"Pimp's, Playa's and Hustla's" feat. Kaveo, Mac Shawn & Funk Mobb- 5:29 
"Hot Sunny Day" feat. Levitti & Marjuna Mitchell- 4:57 
"Nuthin' But Dick"- 5:37 
"Zig Zags & Body Bags" - 3:55
"Empty tha Clip"- 4:29

Samples
Heat 4 Yo Azz
"Cutie Pie" by One Way
What Am I Supposed to Do
"Rumpofsteelskin" by Parliament
"Love's Gonna Get'cha (Material Love)" by Boogie Down Productions

References

Celly Cel albums
1994 debut albums
Albums produced by Studio Ton